Alois Švehlík (born 30 July 1939) is a Czech actor and theatre pedagogue.

Life and career
Švehlík was born in Pardubice, then part of the Protectorate of Bohemia and Moravia, in 1939. Together with his older brother Jaroslav, he became involved in theatre from an early age. He graduated from technical college in Chrudim in 1958 and after basic military service, worked briefly in a factory, where he met his future wife. Theatre was a constant draw for him, however, and Švehlík attempted to get into DAMU, unsuccessfully. Instead, he joined the Central Bohemian Theatre in Kladno, later doing acting stints in Most, Olomouc, and Liberec.

From the mid-1970s, Švehlík began appearing in film and television roles, including Sokolovo (1974), The Young Man and Moby Dick (1979), and Forbidden Dreams (1986). He gained prominence in the 1990s, appearing in numerous productions, including Černí baroni (1992).

In addition to acting, Švehlík has lent his voice to various foreign productions, dubbing such works as The Professionals, Schimanski, Starman, Back to the Future II, The War of the Roses, and As Good as It Gets into the Czech language, winning several awards in the process.

Since 2004, Švehlík has been teaching drama at DAMU. He is a member of the National Theatre in Prague.

Personal life
In 1967, Alois Švehlík married economist Florentina Švehlíková (née Štěpánová). They have three children, including son David, who is also an actor.
Švehlík has appeared with his son in various productions in theatre, television, and film (Operace Silver A, Alois Nebel), as well as in dubbing and voice acting.

Awards and recognition
 František Filipovský Prize for Best Male Performance in dubbing As Good as It Gets (1999)
 Theatre News Award for Best Actor in Z cizoty (2004)
 František Filipovský Prize for Best Male Performance in dubbing The Secret of Santa Vittoria (2007)
 František Filipovský Prize for Lifetime Achievement (2014)

Selected filmography

References

External links
 

1939 births
Czech male stage actors
Czech male film actors
Czech male television actors
Czech male voice actors
Living people
People from Pardubice
Academic staff of the Academy of Performing Arts in Prague
Recipients of the Thalia Award